This is the Summary of the Boxing event at the 2009 Southeast Asian Games in Vientiane, Laos.

Medal table

Medalists

Men

Women

Results

Men's Events

Pin Weight - 45 Kilograms

Light Fly Weight - 48 Kilograms

Fly Weight - 51 Kilograms

Bantam Weight - 54 Kilograms

Feather Weight - 57 Kilograms

Light Weight - 60 Kilograms

Light Welter Weight - 64 Kilograms

Welter Weight - 69 Kilograms

Middle Weight - 75 Kilograms

Light Heavy Weight - 81 Kilograms

Women's Events

Pin Weight - 46 Kilograms

Light Fly Weight - 48 Kilograms

Fly Weight - 51 Kilograms

Bantam Weight - 54 Kilograms

Feather Weight - 57 Kilograms

Light Weight - 60 Kilograms
- Canceled  Event

2009 Southeast Asian Games events
Boxing at the Southeast Asian Games
2009 in boxing